Camp Helen State Park is a Florida State Park and historic site located west of Panama City Beach, in northwestern Florida. The park is south of U.S. 98, and bounded by the Gulf of Mexico and Lake Powell (one of the largest coastal dune lakes in the state). The park was added to the National Register of Historic Places on May 24, 2012.

Recreational activities
The park has such amenities as beaches, birding, beachcombing, boating, canoeing, fishing, hiking, kayaking, picnicking areas, swimming and wildlife viewing.
It also has a visitor center and an interpretive exhibit.

References

External links

 at 

Parks in Bay County, Florida
State parks of Florida
Protected areas established in 1996
National Register of Historic Places in Bay County, Florida
Parks on the National Register of Historic Places in Florida